Pravda (Russian for "truth" and "justice") is a Russian broadsheet newspaper, formerly the official newspaper of the Communist Party of the Soviet Union.

Pravda ("truth" in various Slavic languages) may also refer to:

Newspapers
 Pravda (Slovakia), a major newspaper in Slovakia
 Pravda (Serbia), a Serbian tabloid daily newspaper published from 2007 until 2012

 Dnestrovskaya Pravda, a Russian language newspaper in Transnistria
 Komsomolskaya Pravda, an all-Russian daily newspaper
 Pionerskaya Pravda, an all-Russian newspaper
 Ukrayinska Pravda, a Ukrainian internet newspaper
 European Pravda, a Ukrainian internet newspaper
 Pravda.ru, a Russian internet newspaper

Magazines
 Pravda (Lithuania), a monthly magazine in Lithuania

Places
 Pravda, Azerbaijan
 Pravda, Kyrgyzstan, a village in Osh Region
 Pravda, Tajikistan
 Pravda Castle, in the Czech Republic
 The Komsomolskaya Pravda Islands in the Russian Arctic

Surname 
 George Pravda (1916–1985), Czechoslovak theatre, film and television actor
 Hana Maria Pravda (1916–2008), Czech-British actress
 Christian Pravda (1927–1994), Austrian alpine ski racer
 Isobel Pravda, English actress
 Simeon Pravda, Ukrainian military commander

Other
 Steamer Pravda, a Soviet steamer active in the Arctic in the 1930s
 Russkaya Pravda, the legal code of medieval Kievan Rus
 Pravda (play), a 1985 play satirising the British newspaper industry
 Pravda (novel), a 2007 novel by Edward Docx
 Kino-Pravda, a newsreel series
 "Pravda" (Law & Order: Criminal Intent), an episode of the television series Law & Order: Criminal Intent
 Pravda Records, American independent record label 
 Pravda Girls High School, one of the high schools in the anime Girls und Panzer